Simhada Guri (Kannada: ಸಿಂಹದ ಗುರಿ; English: Aim of a lion) is a 1998 Indian Kannada film, directed by U. Narayan Rao and produced by K. Raghava Rao. The film stars Vishnuvardhan, Amulya, Charulatha and Shobhraj in lead roles. The film had musical score by Shiva.

Cast

Vishnuvardhan
Amulya
Charulatha
Shobhraj
Lakshman
Lohithaswa
Sarigama Viji
Umesh
Karibasavaiah
Vasudeva Rao
Harish Roy
Sathyajith
M. S. Karanth
Srishailan
Nanjundaiah
M. N. Lakshmidevi
Rekha Das

Reception
The Hindu wrote "Vishnuvardhan complements V Narayana Rao’s pointed direction with a dignified and natural performance. “Simhada Gun’, despite its violence as almost justified by its genre, is absorbing and it retains that gripping quality almost until the end, notwithstanding its clichéd subject."

References

1990s Kannada-language films
Indian action films
1998 action films
1998 films